Twyford is a hamlet and civil parish in the English county of Norfolk.

At the 2011 Census the population remained less than 100 and was included in the civil parish of Guist. For the purposes of local government, the parish falls within the Upper Wensum Ward of Breckland District Council and the Elmham and Mattishall Division of Norfolk County Council.

The name Twyford derives from the Anglo Saxon and means 'double ford'. There are several other places called Twyford.

Twyford Hall is a Grade II listed 17th-century country house, situated on the A1067 to the north of the hamlet.

St Nicholas's Church dates from Saxon times with a tower and porch from 1732 and later remodelling. The church is run as part of the heart of Norfolk group of rural parishes, with clergy based in North Elmham.

Notes

External links

Information from Genuki Norfolk on Twyford.

Villages in Norfolk
Breckland District
Civil parishes in Norfolk